The 2018 Simpson Race Products Ginetta Junior Championship is a multi-event, one make motor racing championship held across England and Scotland. The championship features a mix of professional motor racing teams and privately funded drivers, aged between 14 and 17, competing in Ginetta G40s that conformed to the technical regulations for the championship. It forms part of the extensive program of support categories built up around the British Touring Car Championship centrepiece. It is the twelfth Ginetta Junior Championship, commencing on 8 April 2018 at Brands Hatch – on the circuit's Indy configuration – and concluding on 30 September 2018 at the same venue, utilising the Grand Prix circuit, after 25 races held at ten meetings, all in support of the 2018 British Touring Car Championship.

Teams and drivers

Race Calendar

Championship standings

Drivers' championship
A driver's best 24 scores counted towards the championship, with any other points being discarded.

Notes

References

External links
 
 Ginetta Junior Series News

Ginetta Junior Championship season
Ginetta Junior Championship seasons